Madra was an ancient Indo-Aryan tribe of north-western South Asia whose existence is attested since the Vedic period. The members of the Madra tribe were called the Madrakas.

Location
The Madras were divided into -Madra ("northern Madra"), -Madra ("southern Madra"), and Madra proper:

The Uttara Madrakas lived to the north of the Himavat, near the Uttara Kurus, possibly in the Kashmir Valley.

The Madras proper lived in the Rachna Doab in the central Punjab, to the west of the Irāvatī river. These Madras were organised into a kingdom and had their capital at Sāgala or Śākala.

The Dakṣiṇa Madrakas lived to the east of Śākala, near the Trigartas.

History
The Madrakas, as well as the neighbouring Kekaya and Uśīnara tribes, were descended from the Ṛgvedic Anu tribe which lived near the Paruṣṇī river in the central Punjab region, in the same area where the Madrakas were later located.

Madra proper
Several Vedic scholars from the  period were from Madra proper, including Śākalya, who was a member of the court of the Vaideha king Janaka, as well as Madragāra Śauṅgāyani, and Uddālaka Āruṇi's teacher Patañchala Kāpya.

During the 6th century BCE, the Madrakas, along with the Kekayas, Uśīnaras, and Sibis, fell under the suzerainty of the Gandhāra kingdom, which was the principal imperial power in north-west Iron Age South Asia.

During the 5th century BCE, Kṣemā, the daughter of the Madraka king, was married to the Māgadhī king Bimbisāra, who himself engaged in diplomatic relations with the Madrakas' suzerain, the Gandhari king Pukkusāti.

In epic literature

In the latter, the wife of the Kuru king Pāṇḍu was a Madraka princess eponymously named Mādrī, after the kingdom which she hailed from.

References

Further reading

Ancient peoples of Pakistan